was a Japanese swimmer. He competed in the men's 100 metre backstroke at the 1936 Summer Olympics. He was killed in action during World War II.

References

External links
 

1919 births
1944 deaths
Japanese male freestyle swimmers
Olympic swimmers of Japan
Swimmers at the 1936 Summer Olympics
Place of birth missing
Japanese military personnel killed in World War II
20th-century Japanese people